Franklin Gene Bissell (April 12, 1926 – January 28, 2016) was an American football player and coach.  He served as the head football coach at Kansas Wesleyan University from 1952 to 1961 and again from 1963 to 1978, compiling a record of 115–119–7.

Playing career
Bissell entered Heidelberg College and graduated after three years.  While at Heidelberg, he played defensive tackle and also was a punter under the head coach. Paul Hoernemann.  Bissell started for three-years and was co-captain of the undefeated 1948 Ohio Athletic Conference championship team.  Bissell also lettered in basketball two years and pitched for the baseball squad.

Coaching career
A graduate of Heidelberg College, Bissell started his career at Kansas Wesleyan University as an assistant football coach in 1950. In 1952, he was named the 13th head football coach at Kansas Wesleyan. He also coached track and was an assistant basketball coach, in addition to teaching a full academic schedule. His record as the head football coach at Kansas Wesleyan was 115–119–7. His Coyotes won four KCAC championships. He died on January 28, 2016, at the age of 89.

Head coaching record

References

External links
  

1926 births
2016 deaths
Baseball pitchers
Heidelberg Student Princes baseball players
Heidelberg Student Princes football players
Heidelberg Student Princes men's basketball players
Kansas Wesleyan Coyotes football coaches
Players of American football from Akron, Ohio